The 1980 Canadian Professional Championship was a professional non-ranking snooker tournament, which took place between 18 and 22 March 1980 at the Masonic Temple in Toronto, Canada.

Cliff Thorburn won the title beating Jim Wych 9–6 in the final.

Main draw

Century breaks

 131, 130, 112  Cliff Thorburn
 119  Kevin Robitaille
 114  John Bear

References

Canadian Professional Championship
1980 in snooker